The Kalman–Yakubovich–Popov lemma is a result in system analysis and control theory which states: Given a number , two n-vectors B, C and an n x n Hurwitz matrix A, if the pair  is completely controllable, then a symmetric matrix P and a vector Q satisfying

exist if and only if

Moreover, the set  is the unobservable subspace for the pair .

The lemma can be seen as a generalization of the Lyapunov equation in stability theory.  It establishes a relation between a linear matrix inequality involving the state space constructs A, B, C and a condition in the frequency domain.

The Kalman–Popov–Yakubovich lemma which was first formulated and proved  in 1962 by  Vladimir Andreevich Yakubovich  where it was stated that for the strict frequency inequality. The case of nonstrict frequency inequality was published in 1963 by Rudolf E. Kálmán. In that paper the relation to solvability of the Lur’e equations was also established. Both papers considered scalar-input systems. The constraint on the control dimensionality was removed in 1964 by Gantmakher and Yakubovich and independently by Vasile Mihai Popov. Extensive review of the topic can be found in.

Multivariable Kalman–Yakubovich–Popov lemma
for all  
there exists a matrix  such that  and 
The corresponding equivalence for strict inequalities holds even if  is not controllable.

References

Lemmas
Stability theory

B. Brogliato, R. Lozano, M. Maschke, O. Egeland, Dissipative Systems Analysis and Control, Springer Nature Switzerland AG, 3rd Edition, 2020 (chapter 3, pp.81-262), ISBN 978-3--030-19419-2